Plicatol may refer to:

 Plicatol A
 Plicatol B
 Plicatol C